Markus Gandler (born 20 August 1966 in Kitzbühel) is an Austrian former cross-country skier who competed from the late 1980s to the late 1990s.

At the 1989 FIS Nordic World Ski Championships in Lahti, his team ranked 11th in the 4 × 10 km relay. In the winter of 1989/1990 he had his best World Cup finish with a third in Canmore, Canada.

He won an Olympic silver medal in the men's 10 km at the 1998 Winter Olympics in Nagano.

At the 1999 FIS Nordic World Ski Championships in Ramsau, he won gold in 4 × 10 km relay with  his relay teammates Alois Stadlober, Mikhail Botwinov, and Christian Hoffmann.

Since 2003, and also at the 2006 Winter Olympics in Turin, Italy he has been director of the Austrian biathlon and cross-country teams.

He received a life ban from the Austrian Olympic Committee in 2007 as one of 14 team officials who were implicated in doping activity at the 2006 Winter Olympics. The bans on Gandler and 11 others were subsequently rescinded in 2009, after the International Ski Federation dropped doping charges against Gandler, biathlon coach  Alfred Eder and cross-country ski coach Gerald Heigl.

Cross-country skiing results
All results are sourced from the International Ski Federation (FIS).

Olympic Games
 1 medal – (1 silver)

World Championships
 1 medal – (1 gold)

World Cup

Season standings

Individual podiums
1 podium

Team podiums

 2 victories 
 2 podiums 

Note:   Until the 1999 World Championships, World Championship races were included in the World Cup scoring system.

References

External links
 Personal Website 
 Markus Gandler at Database Olympics
 

1966 births
Living people
People from Kitzbühel
Austrian male cross-country skiers
Olympic cross-country skiers of Austria
Olympic silver medalists for Austria
Cross-country skiers at the 1992 Winter Olympics
Cross-country skiers at the 1998 Winter Olympics
Sportspeople from Tyrol (state)
Olympic medalists in cross-country skiing
FIS Nordic World Ski Championships medalists in cross-country skiing
Medalists at the 1998 Winter Olympics